Timothy James Hemp (born 12 April 1974) is a former Bermudian cricketer.  Hemp was a right-handed batsman who bowled right-arm medium pace.  He was born at Hamilton, Bermuda.

Hemp made his debut for Wales Minor Counties in the 1995 Minor Counties Championship against Dorset.  He made twelve further Minor Counties Championship appearances for the team, the last of which came against Cheshire in 1999.  His MCCA Knockout Trophy debut for the team came in 1996 against Cornwall.  He represented the team in a total of five MCCA Knockout Trophy matches, the last of which came against the Warwickshire Cricket Board in 1999.  His only List A appearance for the team came in the 3rd round of the 1999 NatWest Trophy against Somerset, scoring a single run before being dismissed by Andrew Caddick.

His brother, David, played One Day International and Twenty20 cricket for Bermuda, as well as playing first-class cricket for Warwickshire and Glamorgan.

References

External links
 

1974 births
Living people
People from Hamilton, Bermuda
Bermudian cricketers
Wales National County cricketers
Welsh cricketers